The Fremont Stokes House is a historic house at 319 Grandview in Clarksville, Arkansas.  it is a -story wood-frame structure, with a hip roof, weatherboard siding, and a brick foundation.  It is a high quality local example of Colonial Revival architecture with a symmetrical three-bay facade that has fluted pilasters at the corners.  A single-story porch extends across the front and around to both sides, with a projecting gabled stair.  It was built in 1908 for Fremont Stokes, the owner of a local coal mining company.

The house was listed on the National Register of Historic Places in 2008.

See also
National Register of Historic Places listings in Johnson County, Arkansas

References

Houses on the National Register of Historic Places in Arkansas
National Register of Historic Places in Johnson County, Arkansas
Colonial Revival architecture in Arkansas
Houses completed in 1908
Houses in Johnson County, Arkansas
1908 establishments in Arkansas